This is a list of 167 species in the genus Dufourea.

Dufourea species

References

Dufourea